Ayustina Delia Priatna (born ) is an Indonesian female road cyclist and track cyclist. She won the silver medal in the  omnium at the 2022 Asian Track Cycling Championships.

References

1997 births
Living people
Indonesian female cyclists
Place of birth missing (living people)
Cyclists at the 2018 Asian Games
Southeast Asian Games medalists in cycling
Southeast Asian Games silver medalists for Indonesia
Southeast Asian Games bronze medalists for Indonesia
Competitors at the 2017 Southeast Asian Games
21st-century Indonesian women